Spinning Coin are a Scottish indie rock band formed in Glasgow in 2014. They are signed to the Domino Records imprint Geographic Music, which is run by Stephen Pastel. Their first album Permo was released in 2017, and the follow-up Hyacinth was released in 2020.

Their debut cassette was released by Fuzzkill Records in 2015, which caught the attention of Geographic Music. They have toured with Teenage Fanclub and recorded with Edwyn Collins.

Discography

Studio albums
Permo (2017)
Hyacinth (2020)

Singles
Spinning Coin (2015) (cassette released by Fuzzkill Records)
Spinning Coin (2015) (cassette released by Winning Sperm Party)
Spinning Coin (2016) (self-released cassette)
Albany / Sides (2016)
Raining on Hope Street (2017)
Sleepless (2017)
Feel You More Than World Right Now (2019)
Visions At The Stars (2019)
Every Law / The Joker / The Theme (2020)

References

British indie rock groups
Musical groups from Glasgow
Musical groups established in 2014